Guam Highway 5 (GH-5) is one of the primary automobile highways in the United States territory of Guam.

Route description
The western end of GH-5 is in Santa Rita at a junction with GH-2A. The roadway runs east and then turns south through Apra Heights, intersecting with the western terminus of GH-17, Cross Island Road. The eastern end of the roadway is at an intersection with GH-12 at the entrance to the Ordnance Annex.

Major intersections

References

005